Ashley Theophane (born 30 August 1980) is a British former professional boxer who competed from 2003 to 2020. He held the British super-lightweight title from 2011 to 2012 and challenged for the WBA super-lightweight title in 2016.

He has fought and won in 12 countries and headlined in Las Vegas. He was a five-year member of Floyd Mayweather Jr.’s Mayweather Promotions in Las Vegas. He has achieved 50 professional victories during a 17-year career.

He is now an author with his biography, Raised By The Hood, in which he tells the story of his life from the mean streets of London to the bright lights of Las Vegas.

Professional boxing career

Early professional career
Theophane made his professional debut at the York Hall, London on 3 June 2003, defeating Lee Bedell. He beat an experienced journeyman, Brian Coleman, in his next fight on 22 July 2003, and won a further five contests throughout 2004 giving him a record of 7–0 at the end of the year. In his first fight of 2005 on 26 March, Theophane suffered his first defeat to Judex Meema at the Empire Theatre in Hackney, losing on points over six rounds. The rest of the year had mixed results with four more wins including two contests with journeyman David Kehoe and a win each over Duncan Cottier and Jus Wallie but with another defeat, this time to Oscar Milkitas on 18 November, again on points although this time over 4 rounds.  

In his first fight of 2006 and now with a record of 11-2 Theophane drew with Daniel Thorpe at the Excel Arena in London's Docklands. The rest of the year saw six more fights and six more wins including three victories fighting in Germany, the latter a win on 2 December against Omar Siala, was for the lightly regarded Global Boxing Council welterweight title at the IFCO Arena in Berlin.  At the end of the year Theophane's record stood at 17-2-1 and on the verge of a challenge for the British title.

Boxing abroad
On 20 January 2007 Theophane defeated Alan Bosworth in a British title eliminator at the Alexandra Palace in Wood Green, stopping him in the 7th round.  The title opportunity was not to come however and Theophane traveled to Saint Lucia for his next fight, a win over Marcos Hernandez on 16 November, 10 months after his last contest with Bosworth.  He finished the year with a return to the York Hall and a win over journeyman Rocky Muscas on 1 December.  

On 15 February 2008 Theophane traveled to Connecticut in the United States and fought his toughest opponent to date, the Frenchman Ali Oubaali. Despite having Oubaali down in the 6th round, Theophane suffered his third defeat on points over 10 rounds to a man who had previously contested both the French national title and the full European title at super featherweight. He returned to the York Hall on 15 June 2008 and returned to winning ways with a win over Geoffrey Munika, and then headed back to the US for what would prove to be a biggest win of his career so far.  The fight in Rochester, New York on 31 July 2008 pitched Theophane against experienced former world champion DeMarcus Corley and ended in an 8-round decision win for the Londoner. Despite the victory, the year ended with Theophane once again fighting at the York Hall and beating journeyman Matt Scriven on 6 December, finishing the year with a record of 23-3-1.

Theophane's first fight of 2009 saw him beat former Commonwealth champion and European title challenger Craig Docherty at the York Hall and this was followed up on 21 June with a win over rookie Mark Douglas for what would be his only fights of the year. On 26 February 2010 he returned to the states and fought the undefeated Danny Garcia at the Don Haskins Convention Centre in El Paso, Texas. The fight ended with a fourth career defeat for Theophane, and with Garcia extending his winning record to 16-0 although only by a split decision. 

On 19 June 2010 Theophane returned to Germany and to winning ways, picking up a title for good measure; The fight in Burghausen represented a first contest of 12 rounds for Theophane and returned a majority decision for the Londoner against Harasch Hotaki from Afghanistan for the IBO international welterweight title. Theophane followed the victory up on 30 July 2010 with another fight in the States, this time in Oklahoma, and defeated the Dominican Republic's USBA welterweight title holder and former IBF world title challenger Delvin Rodriguez for another majority decision this time over 10 rounds. On 10 October 2010 Theophane returned to England and scored a points victory over Willie Thompson in a show at the York Hall winning 60–55 in a six-round contest.

Theophane won the lightly regarded GBC world welterweight title on 28 December 2012 in Luxembourg for the second time.

British champion
On 19 February 2011, Theophane won the British title at London's Wembley Arena. His opponent, the reigning champion Lenny Daws, was making the third defence of the belt.  Despite a slow start, Theophane came on strongly in the second half of the fight and knocked Daws down twice in the 9th round, eventually winning 115–111, 115–111 and 115–112 on the judges' scorecards. Prior to the fight with Daws, Theophane told how he had spent his time training between New York and London and sparring the likes of Dmitry Salita, Steve Williams and Liam Walsh. Speaking of his confidence in terms of winning the fight, Theophane said "I feel like I am dropping down a couple of levels to face Daws but his team bombarded me and my management with emails when I was in America trying to organise this fight, so let's get it on!". 

On 23 July 2011 Theophane made the first defence of his title, beating Jason Cook at the Wembley Arena with a 10th round stoppage. Following the fight, Theophane signed a three-year promotional deal with Hatton Promotions with Ricky Hatton describing him as a "world class boxer". Theophane's second defence should have been against Nigel Wright in Peterlee but a late notice pull out resulted in a change of opponent with only two days notice with Ben Murphy stepping in. The fight took place on 10 December 2011, with Theophane suffering a gruelling opening assault only to break Murphy down in the later rounds to win with an 11th round stoppage.

Training abroad
Theophane has been training abroad since August 2005. He trained at Gleason's gym in Brooklyn which is the oldest gym in America. Theophane has sparred world champions Joan Guzman, Alex O'Shea, Elio Rojas, Yuri Foreman, Paul Malignaggi, and Argenis Mendez at Gleason's. For his big fights, except his fight against former world champion DeMarcus Corley, he has had a training camp at Gleason's gym.

Mayweather Promotions

Theophane trained alongside Floyd Mayweather and was taken under the wing of Mayweather Promotions.

On 1 April 2016 he lost against Adrien Broner by ninth-round TKO in a fight for the WBA light-welterweight title.

Ashley spent 5 years signed to Mayweather Promotions. From August 2013 to May 2018. 
He fought on three Floyd Mayweather undercards at the MGM Grand in Las Vegas.

Ashley is amongst the few British fighters to headline in Las Vegas. December 2016 saw him achieve his 40th professional victory at the Sams Town Casino.

He trained at the Mayweather Boxing Club for three years with US Olympian Nate Jones then two years with former world champion, Lou Del Valle.

Broner vs. Theophane 
On February 19, 2016, Premier Boxing Champions announced that Broner would defend his WBA light welterweight title against British veteran boxer Ashley Theophane (39–6–1, 11 KO) on April 1 at D.C. Armory in Washington, DC live on Spike. Broner was stripped ahead of the fight, for missing the 140-pound limit. Broner defeated Theophane by TKO in the 9th round. Before the stoppage by referee Luis Pabon, Broner was leading on the scorecards 78–74, 78–74, and 77–75. After the fight, Broner called out Floyd Mayweather Jr., as tensions between the former friends had increased in the past months, due to comments about TMT (The Money Team) by Broner.

Theophane  vs Amidu 
His comeback fight came against Yakubu Amidu. Amidu won some rounds, but ultimately Theophane was the better man. Despite being behind on the scorecards, Amidu didn't fight with any urgency even in the last round, which Theophane clearly won, cementing the win via unanimous decision.

World Tour

Ashley parted company with Mayweather Promotions, a year early than his 3-year extended contract due to lack of fights over the two previous years.

He went on a world tour which saw him, fighting and winning in Germany, USA, Hungary twice, Ghana, Poland, Mexico, Romania, Denmark and UAE from December 2017 to October 2019.  

On 5 October 2019, Theophane squared off against veteran Kassim Ouma. Both fighters fought carefully, Theophane perhaps being the more cautious one. Most of the fight did not offer too much entertainment for the fans, apart from the finals rounds which were more action-packed. The fight looked close, but the judges saw it as a clear victory for Theophane, scoring it 100–91, 99–91 and 98–92 in favor of the Brit. 

Theophane ended the tour after achieving 50 professional victories.

Professional boxing record

References

External links 

 Ashley Teophane - Profile, News Archive & Current Rankings at Box.Live

1980 births
People from Paddington
Living people
English male boxers
Light-welterweight boxers
Welterweight boxers
Light-middleweight boxers
British Boxing Board of Control champions
Boxers from Greater London